Illia Razumeiko (Разумейко Ілля Костянтинович, born 1989 in  Zaporizhia) is a Ukrainian composer and member of Ukraine's Opera Aperta project. Many of his best-known compositions are collaborations with fellow composer Ro­man Grygoriv. With Ro­man Grygoriv he co-founded the Porto-Franko festival in 2010 Ivano-Frankivsk.

Selected works
Sviato hryzantem.
IYOV, Job
The Winter Garden's Tale (2018) 
Mother of Apostles (2020)
Chornobyldorf (Roman Grygoriv, Illia Razumeiko) Ukraine 2020 Nova Opera
"Lullaby for Mariupol" (Sung in Ukrainian)

References

Further reading
Schröder, Gesine, Paragraph 3 (Fall 3) of »Lost« »Beyond« »Improvisation«. Bericht von musiktheoretischer Partizipation an drei künstlerischen Promotionsvorhaben (in German). In: zgmth (Journal of the association of German-speaking Music Theory). Retrieved 26 December 2022.

1989 births
Living people
Ukrainian composers